Rüdiger Baldauf (born 31 January 1961 in Bensberg, North Rhine-Westphalia)  is a German jazz musician, trumpet player, composer and arranger.

History 
 1980: secondary-school examinations Nicolaus Cusanus Gymnasium in Bergisch Gladbach.
 1981 - 1985: Conservatory Köln
 1985 - 1988: scholarship holder at the Herbert von Karajan Stiftung in Berlin for Classic Trumpet (professors: Robert Platt and Ack van Rooyen)

Baldauf played with James Brown, Liza Minnelli, Seal, Shirley Bassey, Michael Bublé, and he was on tour with Maceo Parker, Joe Zawinul, Shirley Bassey, Udo Jürgens.

 1989 - 1999: professor for jazz trumpet at the Conservatory Köln
 1999 - 2002: member of the United Jazz + Rock Ensemble
 1992 - 2010: member of the Paul Kuhn Orchestra
 1992 - 2010: regular guest in various German big bands, especially the WDR Big Band Köln

During the late 1980s and the 1990s Baldauf contributed to some 100 studio albums.
He was member of the RTL Allstars which was the band of the first German Comedy TV show called RTL Samstag Nacht.

Since 2003 Baldauf has been playing trumpet in Stefan Raab's Tonight Show TV total in the band heavytones.

In June 2010 Baldauf launched his first solo album with the title Own Style. Prominent guests accompanied him, like Till Brönner, Nils Landgren, Ack van Rooyen, Andy Haderer and Max Mutzke.

Music 
Baldauf completed a classical education but at an early age he preferred Jazz, Funk and Soul.
He used to play the first trumpet in Leonard Bernstein's West Side Story as well as Neue Musik of Mauricio Kagel.

Discography

As leader
 Own Style (Mons, 2010)
 Trumpet Night (Mons, 2012)
 Jackson Trip (Mons, 2017

As guest
 1994 Eddie Harris Last Concert with the WDR Big Band Köln
 1996 Gianna Nannini Profumo
 1999 Bernard Purdie Soul to Jazz
 2000 Wolfgang Haffner Music
 2002 No Angels When the Angels Swing
 2003 Paul Kuhn/Bert Kaempfert Remember When
 2006 SEAL One Night to Remember

References

External links 
 Official site
 Baldauf at Yamaha
 Baldauf at open.pr
 Rüdiger Baldauf and the Heavytones

1961 births
Living people
People from Bergisch Gladbach
German jazz trumpeters
German male jazz musicians
Male trumpeters
21st-century trumpeters
21st-century German male musicians